Trevor Vittatoe (born January 1, 1988) is a former American football quarterback. Until June 21, 2012, he was on the roster of the Indianapolis Colts of the National Football League (NFL). He was signed by the Chicago Bears as an undrafted free agent in 2011. He played college football at Texas-El Paso.

Vittatoe began his football career with Euless Trinity.

College career
Vittatoe attended the University of Texas-El Paso and played quarterback for four years. He left the Miners as their all-time leader in passing yards, passing touchdowns, total offense and touchdowns. He also broke numerous other records. His four-year statistics left him ranking 14th in passing yards and 15th in passing touchdowns and total offense in college football history. Vittatoe finally led the Miners to the New Mexico Bowl game his senior year.

Statistics
Vittatoe's statistics are as follows:

Professional career

Chicago Bears
He signed with the Chicago Bears as a rookie free agent on July 26, 2011. Vittatoe was listed as their 4th string QB. He was waived on August 29, 2011.

Tampa Bay Storm
On February 7, 2012, Vittatoe was assigned to the Tampa Bay Storm of the Arena Football League (AFL).

Indianapolis Colts
On March 9, 2012, Vittatoe was signed by the Indianapolis Colts just one day after releasing Peyton Manning. He was released on June 21, 2012.

See also
 List of Division I FBS passing yardage leaders

References

External links
UTEP profile

1988 births
Players of American football from Texas
American football quarterbacks
Living people
UTEP Miners football players
Chicago Bears players
Tampa Bay Storm players
Indianapolis Colts players